Al-Batuf Regional Council (Mo'atza Azorit al-Batuf) is a regional council located on the southern fringe of the Beit Netofa Valley North of Nazareth within the Northern District of Israel. It was formerly part Nof HaGalil regional council until 2000 and consists of the following four rural Israeli Palestinian Arab villages.

Hamaam
Rumana
Rumat al-Heib    
Uzeir

The regional council is named after the al-Baṭūf Plain (the Arabic name of Beit Netofa Valley), on which it is located. According to the Israeli Central Bureau of Statistics, al-Batuf had a population of 6,700 in 2010.

See also
 Arab localities in Israel

References

 
Regional councils in Northern District (Israel)
Arab localities in Israel